The Pothigai Hills, also known as Agasthiyar Mountain is a 1,866-metre (6,122 ft)-tall peak in the southern part of the Western Ghats of South India. The peak lies in Tirunelveli District of  Tamil Nadu near the border of Kerala.

The area contains several important natural habitats for in-situ conservation of biological diversity, including forests containing threatened species of significant value to science and conservation.

Geography
The western slope is located in the Thiruvananthapuram district of Kerala state, eastern slope of Pothigai hills is in the Tirunelveli district, southern slope is located in Kanyakumari district of Tamil Nadu. At 1,866 meters, it is the highest peak in the rugged Ashambu hills, which have one of the richest concentrations of biodiversity in the Western Ghats. The area is known for its extensive views, forests, waterfalls, ancient temples, and the river Tamirabarani, the lifeline of the region.

Environment 

Agastyamalai is home to the Kanikkaran people, one of the oldest surviving hunter-gatherer tribes in the world.

The Agasthiyar malai include the Indian Ecoregions of South Western Ghats moist deciduous forests above , South Western Ghats montane rain forests above  and shola-grasslands complex on peaks above .

These hills are noted as the habitat for at least 2,000 species of medicinal plants, of which at least 50 are rare and endangered species. There are also wild relatives of jackfruit, mango, cardamom, turmeric and banana.

Endangered mammals here include the Bengal tiger, Indian elephant, lion-tailed macaques, Nilgiri tahr and the vulnerable gaur, sloth bear, Malabar spiny dormouse and Nilgiri marten. There are also Jerdon's palm civet, gray slender loris, great pied hornbills and king cobras. Ecotourism is popular in the area.

History

The Pothigai hills are mentioned as Potiyil, Potiyal, Pothikai and Potalaka in historical sources largely in relation to the river Tamraparni and the ancient Sage Agastya (Akattiyan).

The Egyptian Greek cartographer Ptolemy names the mountain "Bettigo", from where three rivers rise, including Solen (Tamraparni River), meaning chank - the river was famous for its pearl fishing.

At the mountains, Tamil was created by Agastya, according to Kamban and Villiputturar, while Kancipuranam and Tiruvilaiyatarpuranam assert Lord Shiva taught Agastya Tamil just as he had taught Panini Sanskrit. Tamil Hindu tradition holds that Lord Shiva and Lord Murugan taught Agastya the Tamil language, who then constructed a Tamil grammar, at Pothigai mountains. According to the Tambraparni Mahatmyam, an ancient account of the river from its rise to its mouth, a string of red lotus flowers from sage Agastya at Agastya Malai, Pothigai hills, transformed itself into a damsel at the sight of Lord Siva, forming the river at the source and giving it its divine name, Tamraparni. The shrine to Agastiyar at the Pothigai hill source of the Tamraparni river is mentioned in both Ilango Adigal's Silappatikaram and Chithalai Chathanar's Manimekhalai epics, in relation to blessings sought by Sugriva and his army from the Ramayana.

Peraciriyar states that Agastiyar taught this grammar to Tolkappiyar, one of his twelve disciples, at Pothigai hills, who then wrote Tolkāppiyam, although mentions that some scholars believe Tolkappiyar based the Tamil grammar on other forms no longer extant; Agastiyar is not mentioned in Tolkāppiyam. Paripāṭal of the Eṭṭuttokai anthology speaks of "vaynta Potiyin munivan", the famous sage of Poti". In Naccinarkiniyar's commentaries, quoting lines of Nakkeerar, Agastiyar is associated with the Pothigai mountains and pure Tamil. In Sundarar's Tevaram, the Pothigai mountains are mentioned.

Following the establishment of Siddhar Gnana Koodam, and traveling the world to spread his knowledge, Agastya returned to Agastya Mala, the point on the Pothigai hills where he merged into the cosmos. A temple dedicated to him is built here, close to the Papanasam Falls, on the banks of the Thamirabarani River. Pilgrims believe Sage Agastya gives appearances to sincere aspirants and devotees.

Tamil Buddhist tradition developed in Chola literature, such as in Buddamitra's Virasoliyam , states Agastya learnt Tamil from the Bodhisattva Avalokitesvara; the earlier Chinese traveler Xuanzang recorded the existence of a temple dedicated to Avalokitesvara in the South Indian hill Potala. A Buddhist text, Tarasukkam, refers to Avalokitesvara as "Potalagirinivasini". The author of the Silappatikaram, utilizing the word "Potiyil" for the hills, hails the southern breeze that emanates from the hills that blows over the kingdom of the Pandyans of Madurai and Korkai that own it. Chithalai Chathanar's Manimekhalai describes a river flowing on the slope of Potiyil mountain where the Buddhist monks observed meditation. The author utilized the word "Potiyil" for Buddhist pallis. In fellow Sangam work Kuṟuntokai of the Eṭṭuttokai anthology, a Buddhist vihara under a Banyan tree is described at the top of the mountain. A comment that God had disappeared from the mountain was found in Ahananuru, from whose inaccessible top the stream of clear waters flows down with noise in torrents, and the fact that old men assembled and played dice in the dilapidated temple is described in Purananuru.

The Japanese scholar Shu Hikosaka on the basis of his study of Buddhist scriptures, ancient Tamil literature, as well as field survey, proposes the hypothesis that, the ancient mount Potalaka, the residence of Avalokiteśvara described in the Gaṇḍavyūha Sūtra and Xuanzang’s Records, is the real mountain Pothigai (or Potiyil) situated at Ambasamudram in Tirunelveli district, Tamil Nadu. Shu also says that mount Potiyil/Potalaka has been a sacred place for the people of South India from time immemorial. With the spread of Buddhism in the region beginning at the time of the great king Aśoka in the third century B.C.E., it became a holy place also for Buddhists who gradually became dominant as a number of their hermits settled there. The local people, though, mainly remained followers of the Hindu religion. The mixed Hindu-Buddhist cult culminated in the formation of the figure of Avalokiteśvara.

Protected areas
The southern side of the hills in Tamil Nadu includes Kanyakumari Wildlife Sanctuary a  protected area in Kanyakumari district, Tamil Nadu. The eastern side of the hills in Tamil Nadu includes the Kalakkad Mundanthurai Tiger Reserve (KMTR), a  protected area. The Kerala side of the hills hosts the  Neyyar Wildlife Sanctuary, the  Peppara Wildlife Sanctuary, the  Shenduruny Wildlife Sanctuary and the Kulathupuzha and Palode Reserve forests near Courtallam. The Naraikadu forest or "grey jungle", surrounded by the Kalakad Mundanthurai Tiger Reserve, is privately owned by the Dhonavur Fellowship. This community has restored and protected the area so well that it is one of the best preserved forest tracts in the whole Ashambu Hills.

These protected areas in the Agasthyamala Hills comprise the Agasthyamalai Biosphere Reserve (ABR).

The Western Ghats, Agasthyamalai Sub-Cluster, including all of Agasthyamalai Biosphere Reserve, included in Man and the Biosphere(MAB) programme by the UNESCO World Heritage Committee that concluded in Peru on 19 March 2016.

Tourism

There are several Hindu Temples and seasonal waterfalls which are tourist attractions in these hills. At Suruli Falls there is a 2-stage Cascading water fall The Suruli River supplying the falls originates from the Meghamalai Hills. The falls drop from a height of  collect into a pool, flow for a short distance and again plummet an additional . Near the falls are 18 caves some of which represent Indian rock-cut architecture temples of the 18th Century.

Many pilgrims climb Agasthyamalai in the core of the hills to perform a puja ceremony at the Agasthya Murti on the top the Peak. Most pilgrims use the well-worn path through Peppara Wildlife Sanctuary on the Kerala side.
The trekkers start from Bonaccord estate in Thiruvananthapuram district with a guide from the Forest Department. The first night is spent at a camp facility set up by the Department in the middle of the forests. Trekkers reach the peak the next day and return to the camp the same day. Only 100 pilgrims per day are allowed on this route during the January February season.

Visitors must obtain an entry pass from the Trivandrum Forest Headquarters or through Online booking against payment of Rs 1000. The Chief Conservator is responsible for on-site management of the protected areas on the Kerala side of the Hills.

Gallery

References

External links

Geography of Kollam district
Geography of Thiruvananthapuram district
Geography of Tirunelveli district
Hills of Kerala
Hills of Tamil Nadu
Kanyakumari district
Mountains of the Western Ghats
Protected areas of Kerala
South Western Ghats moist deciduous forests
South Western Ghats montane rain forests
Tamil language
Tourist attractions in Kollam district
Tourist attractions in Thiruvananthapuram district
Tourism in Kerala
Tourism in Tamil Nadu
Wildlife sanctuaries in Tamil Nadu